Svestad is a village and a former oil and gas harbour in Akershus, Norway. Svestad is situated at the Oslofjorden side of the peninsula and municipality of Nesodden just south of Oslo.

Villages in Akershus